The 8th Golden Horse Awards (Mandarin:第8屆金馬獎) took place on October 30, 1970 at Zhongshan Hall in Taipei, Taiwan.

Winners and nominees 
Winners are listed first, highlighted in boldface.

References

8th
1970 film awards
1970 in Taiwan